Färgelanda is a locality and the seat of Färgelanda Municipality, Västra Götaland County, Sweden. It had 1,894 inhabitants in 2010.

References 

Municipal seats of Västra Götaland County
Swedish municipal seats
Populated places in Västra Götaland County
Populated places in Färgelanda Municipality
Dalsland